Cumberland Basin (or Cumberland Market Basin) was a canal basin near to Euston railway station in London, England and a part of the Regent's Canal. It was originally known as Jew's Harp Basin in the 1880s, after a nearby public house. 

The basin's excavation was authorised in 1813 to serve Cumberland Market and then-industrial "New Road" and in 1941-1942 was filled back in chiefly using rubble from the London Blitz of those years and the previous year.

Cumberland Arm

The Cumberland Turn junction with the Regent's Canal is still visible with the short stub-end of the arm remaining housing the Feng Shang Floating Restaurant.

In the 1880s, American writer Ellis Martin was touring the London canals, but chose not to enter the basin as an 1850s report described it as "no better than a stagnant putrid ditch", and noted that cholera had spread amongst nearby neighbourhoods and boat-dwellers.

The basin and associated works were authorised in 1813 to serve Cumberland Market and New Road (now Euston Road), and closed in 1942.

The basin was dammed off in August 1938, and during the Blitz, the arm was used to supply water to fire pumps attending fires through the West End. By 1941, the arm and basin had been filled in with rubble from demolished buildings.

Historical remains
Starting after World War I, sections of the area around the Cumberland Market were used by the Crown Estate to develop housing for war veterans.  Eventually the land right beside the Cumberland Basin was included in these allotments for the Cumberland Market Estate. Some street lamps associated with the basin remain on Gloucester Gate Bridge above the Main Line of the Regent's Canal just west of Cumberland Turn.

References

Cumberland Arm
Transport in the London Borough of Camden
Former buildings and structures in the London Borough of Camden
London docks
Canal basins in England and Wales